"I'm Not Alone" is a 2009 song by Calvin Harris.

I'm Not Alone may also refer to:

 I'm Not Alone (album), a 2005 album by Keith Martin, or its title song
 I'm Not Alone (EP), a 2010 EP by Patent Pending, or its title song
 I'm Not Alone, an album by Mattie Moss Clark
 "I'm Not Alone", a song by Crystal Kay from Crystal Kay
 "I'm Not Alone", a song by Widespread Panic from Huntsville 1996  
 "I'm Not Alone", a song by The David from Pebbles, Volume 9
 "I'm Not Alone", a song by Erik Segerstedt from A Different Shade
 "I'm Not Alone", a song by Disperse
 "I'm Not Alone", a song by Shane Wiebe
 "I'm Not Alone", a song by Jazzfeezy Presents: Unveiling the Rapture
 "I'm Not Alone", a song by character Carrie White from the musical Carrie